Martin Chren (born 2 January 1984) is a retired Slovak football defender who last played for ViOn Zlaté Moravce.

Chren's career was linked with ViOn Zlaté Moravce for some 20 years. In June 2022, Chren retired from professional football.

References

External links
 
  at fcvion.sk 

1984 births
Living people
People from Zlaté Moravce
Sportspeople from the Nitra Region
Slovak footballers
Slovak expatriate footballers
Association football defenders
FC ViOn Zlaté Moravce players
SV Horn players
KFC Komárno players
Slovak Super Liga players
Austrian Regionalliga players
Expatriate footballers in Austria
Slovak expatriate sportspeople in Austria